Thomas Edward Neville Jameson (born 23 July 1946) is a former English cricketer. Jameson was a left-handed batsman who bowled right-arm medium pace. He was born in Bombay and educated at Taunton School.

Jameson studied initially at Durham University (1966–1969). Later enrolling at the University of Cambridge, where he gained a cricketing Blue, Jameson made his first-class debut for Cambridge University against Warwickshire at Fenner's in 1970. He made eight further first-class appearances for the university in that season, the last of which came against Oxford University in The University Match at Lord's. In his nine appearances for the university, he scored 118 runs at an average of 9.07, with a high score of 31 not out. With the ball, he took 10 wickets at a bowling average of 45.60, with best figures of 2/21. Jameson also made a single first-class appearance in 1970 for Warwickshire against Cambridge University at Edgbaston, making scores of 31 and 32 in a drawn match. This was his only major appearance for Warwickshire.

His brother, John, played Test cricket for England.

References

External links
Thomas Jameson at ESPNcricinfo
Thomas Jameson at CricketArchive

1946 births
Living people
Cricketers from Mumbai
People educated at Taunton School
English cricketers
Cambridge University cricketers
Warwickshire cricketers
Alumni of Hatfield College, Durham
Alumni of Emmanuel College, Cambridge